The Corrs are an Irish folk rock/pop band consisting of siblings Andrea (lead vocals, tin whistle, mandolin, ukulele), Sharon (violin, vocals), Caroline (drums, piano, bodhrán, percussion, vocals) and Jim Corr (guitar, piano, keyboards, vocals). Formed in their hometown of Dundalk, Ireland, in 1990, the band's discography includes seven studio albums, three live albums and three compilation albums, as well as six video albums and twenty-six singles. This list does not include material recorded by The Corrs as solo artists.

Their debut album, Forgiven, Not Forgotten, was produced by David Foster and released in 1995 by Atlantic Records in conjunction with 143 Records. Preceded by debut single "Runaway", the album was an immediate success in both their home territory and Australia. Commercial success elsewhere was initially modest, however. Their 1997 follow-up, Talk On Corners, once again found the band receiving little attention outside Ireland and Australia. Meanwhile, the group had contributed a cover of Fleetwood Mac's "Dreams" to Legacy: A Tribute to Fleetwood Mac's Rumours. On 17 March 1998, they performed the song at London's Royal Albert Hall alongside Fleetwood Mac drummer Mick Fleetwood as part of the BBC's televised coverage of St. Patrick's Day. This event did much to raise the band's profile. Following this, Talk On Corners was re-released to include their cover of "Dreams", along with new single versions of "What Can I Do?", "So Young" and "Runaway". Selling almost 3 million copies in the UK, the album was the highest-selling release of 1998 and ninth highest-selling of 1999, and remains the nineteenth best-selling album of all time in British chart history. The album is also the twelfth highest-selling album of all time in Ireland.

Their first live album, Unplugged, was released in 1999 and was followed ten months later by In Blue. Dedicated to the memory of their mother Jean, who died during production of the album, it went straight to number one in Ireland with the third highest opening week sales in the history of the chart. Lead single "Breathless" gave them their first and only UK number one, while the album also attained platinum status in the United States for shipments of over one million units. The set also topped the charts in seventeen other countries.

Borrowed Heaven (2004) was a return to their Celtic roots, after the more pop-oriented In Blue. It peaked at number one in Ireland and was certified gold or platinum in numerous territories, including Australia, France, Germany and New Zealand, among others. Home, which featured traditional Irish music taken from their late mother's songbook, was released in 2005. Dreams: The Ultimate Corrs Collection (2006) was released following the announcement that the band would go on indefinite hiatus, citing personal reasons. In the following years, members of the band would go on to have eight children between them. Andrea would also go on to have starring roles in three feature films, and acted in the play Dancing at Lughnasa. Both Andrea and Sharon also released solo albums, Ten Feet High (2007) and Lifelines (2011); and Dream of You (2010) and The Same Sun (2013), respectively. The band reformed in 2015 and subsequently released a further two studio albums: White Light (2015) and Jupiter Calling (2017). The Corrs have sold more than 40 million albums worldwide.

Albums

Studio albums

Live albums

Notes
 A ^ Released only in Japan.
 B ^ Released only in the US; charted in Ireland as an import release.

Compilation albums

Singles

Notes

Other charted songs

Videography

Video albums

Music videos

References

External links
 

Discography
Corrs, The
Folk music discographies
Corrs, The